Daniel V. Asay (June 26, 1847 – May 2, 1930) was an iceboat racer. He claimed to be the oldest ice yacht sailor in the world. His ice boat Gull competed in more races than any other in its class.

Biography
He was born on June 26, 1847, in Wrightstown, New Jersey. He married Sarah E. Bowman (1843–1896) and after her death married Mary Long (1865–1926). He designed, and sailed his iceboats along the frozen Shrewsbury River.

He died on May 2, 1930 in Red Bank, New Jersey.

References

External links

1847 births
1930 deaths
Ice yachting
People from Red Bank, New Jersey
People from Burlington County, New Jersey